Pottenstein is a town in the district of Baden in Lower Austria in Austria.

Geography
Pottenstein lies in the valley of the Triesting in the Vienna Woods and borders on Berndorf and Weissenbach an der Triesting.

The operatic soprano Daniela Fally was born in Pottenstein.

References

Cities and towns in Baden District, Austria